This is the list of episodes for The Late Late Show with Craig Ferguson in 2005.

2005

January

February

March

April

May

June

July

August

September

October

November

December

References

External links
 Craig Ferguson on Twitter